Jabal Ḥubaysh, or Jabal Hobeish may refer to the following mountains:

 Jabal Hubaysh, Saudi Arabia of the Midian range in Tabuk Region, Saudi Arabia
 Jabal Hubaysh, Yemen of the Sarawat range in Ibb Province, Yemen

See also 
 Hobeish (disambiguation)